Madhavaram, is an uninhabited village in Vontimitta Taluk, Kadapa district in the state of Andhra Pradesh in India.

Demographics

References

External links 

Cities and towns in Kadapa district